Lommel S.K. is a Belgian professional association football club based in Lommel, who currently play in the Belgian First Division B.

Although the club was formed in the immediate aftermath of the dissolution of K.F.C. Lommel S.K. in 2003, this list consists only of the refounded club's history since that date.

Background 
In 1927, the club Vlug & Vrij Overpelt-Usines was formed and registered with the Royal Belgian Football Association, playing in the nearby municipality of Overpelt. The club would be refounded and renamed several times in its history, spending approximately equal amounts of time in each of the Belgian Fourth, Third and Second divisions.

In 2003, neighbouring club K.F.C. Lommel S.K. were declared bankrupt. The more notable of the two clubs in recent seasons, board members of the Lommel club contacted their opposite numbers in Overpelt and an agreement was made that the surviving club would transfer to the stadium in Lommel and would be re-registered under the name K.V.S.K. United Overpelt-Lommel (abbreviated to KVSK United), retaining Overpelt's third tier status. The club initially mixed the colours of the two clubs but eventually came to favour the green and white of Lommel.

Promoted at the second time of asking, after an undefeated 2004–05 season, Lommel have retained their second flight status ever since except for one season spent in the third tier in 2017–18. In 2010 they merged with KFC Racing Mol-Wezel to become Lommel United. In 2017 they renamed themselves to their present name of Lommel S.K.

Seasons 
Correct as of end of the 2018–19 season

References

External links 
 Uruguayan league histories at rsssf.com

Lommel S.K.
Belgian football club seasons